The men's artistic individual all-around was an artistic gymnastics event held as part of the Gymnastics at the 1904 Summer Olympics programme. It was the second time an all-around event was held at the Olympics. The competition was held on Friday, July 1, 1904 and on Saturday, July 2, 1904. One hundred and nineteen gymnasts from three nations competed. The event was won by Julius Lenhart, an Austrian gymnast living in the United States and competing under the auspices of his Philadelphia-based club. Silver went to Wilhelm Weber of Germany, with bronze to Adolf Spinnler of Switzerland. They were the first medals in the event for each of those nations, as France had swept the medals in 1900.

The scores from this event, with some adjustments, were also used for the men's team event.

Background

This was the second appearance of the men's individual all-around. The first individual all-around competition had been held in 1900, after the 1896 competitions featured only individual apparatus events. A men's individual all-around has been held every Games since 1900. At the time, it was common to include athletics events along with gymnastics competitions in a combined event such as this.

Another combined event was held in 1904, during the later October gymnastics events.

The United States made its debut in the event. Germany and Switzerland each made their second appearance, the only two nations to have competed at both editions of the event to that point.

Competition format

The scores in the all-around were the sum of the results of the athletic triathlon and gymnastics triathlon events. They thus included competition in the 100 yard dash, long jump, shot put, horizontal bar, parallel bars, and horse (both vaulting horse and pommel horse).

For the gymnastics triathlon, each competitor performed a total of 9 routines—3 on each of the three apparatus. Each set of three routines included two compulsory exercises and one optional exercise. For the horse apparatus, there was one compulsory exercise in each of the vaulting horse and pommel horse, with the optional exercise being on the pommel horse. There was a maximum score of 5 points for each exercise, for a total of 15 points in each apparatus and 45 points for the triathlon.

In the athletics triathlon, the three events were the 100 yards, the long jump, and the shot put. There was no maximum score for each event, but rather a "standard" score of 10 and competitors would receive a score above or below 10 based on whether they performed better or worse than the "standard" result. In the 100 yards, the standard was 11.0 seconds, with a .1 point addition or subtraction for every .2 seconds faster or slower. In the long jump, the standard was 18 feet, with a .1 point addition or subtraction for each .1 feet longer or shorter. In the shot put, the standard was 30 feet, with a .1 point addition or subtraction for each .2 feet longer or shorter.

Schedule

Results

References

Sources
 

All-around